Wilson Robert "Frog" Redus (January 29, 1905 – March 23, 1979) was an American baseball infielder in the Negro leagues. He played from 1924 to 1940 with several teams, including the St. Louis Stars and the Chicago American Giants.

References

External links
 and Baseball-Reference Black Baseball stats and Seamheads

1905 births
1979 deaths
St. Louis Stars (baseball) players
Indianapolis ABCs players
Cleveland Browns (baseball) players
Chicago American Giants players
Columbus Blue Birds players
Cleveland Giants players
Cleveland Red Sox players
Kansas City Monarchs players
Baseball players from Oklahoma
20th-century African-American sportspeople
Baseball infielders